Heidi Jensen is a Danish former cricketer. She played five Women's One Day International matches for the Denmark women's national cricket team between 1990 and 1991.

References

External links
 

Year of birth missing (living people)
Living people
Danish women cricketers
Denmark women One Day International cricketers
Place of birth missing (living people)